The Mercedes F1 W04 (originally known as the Mercedes AMG W04) is a Formula One racing car designed and built by the Mercedes team for use in the 2013 season. It was driven by 2008 World Champion Lewis Hamilton, who joined the team after Michael Schumacher's retirement, and Nico Rosberg, who remained with the team for a fourth season. This was the first Mercedes car to feature sponsorship from BlackBerry.

Background 
Following a difficult 2012 season in which the team finished fifth in the World Constructors' Championship despite recording their maiden victory at the Chinese Grand Prix, team principal Ross Brawn carried out an extensive array of changes to the team's engineering positions. Aldo Costa was recruited from Ferrari, as were Geoff Willis from the now-defunct HRT F1 Team and Mike Elliott from Lotus F1. Parallel to this, Mercedes's long-time Vice President of Motorsport Norbert Haug left the team; he was replaced by Toto Wolff, who left his role of Executive Director at Williams to take the position.

Race history
The W04 endured a difficult start to its season. Although Hamilton and Rosberg secured two podium finishes and three consecutive pole position starts within the first five races, the car developed a reputation for being notoriously harsh on its tyres during a time when tyre supplier Pirelli was faced with heavy criticism for the delicate structure of its tyre compounds, and the narrow operating window, which exacerbated the W04's inherent flaws. This was evidenced in the Bahrain and Spanish Grands Prix, where Nico Rosberg qualified on pole for both races, but went on to finish them in ninth and sixth places respectively.

At the Monaco Grand Prix, the W04 achieved its second front row lockout in as many races (Rosberg and Hamilton locked out the front row in Spain) with Nico Rosberg on pole and Lewis Hamilton in second. Rosberg went on to win the race, repeating the feat of his father Keke Rosberg in the 1983 race, Hamilton finished in fourth.

At the British Grand Prix, Hamilton qualified on pole with Rosberg in second. In the race, Hamilton was comfortably leading, until lap 8, when his car suffered a left-rear tyre failure on the Wellington Straight. Felipe Massa had a similar tyre failure and a subsequent tyre explosion on Jean-Éric Vergne's car brought out the safety car on lap 16. Rosberg went on to win the race ahead of Red Bull's Mark Webber by just 0.7 seconds giving Mercedes their second win of the season.

In Hungary Hamilton secured his first win for the team after starting on pole position, he managed his tyres without any of the early season trouble he had faced. Rosberg dropped back at the start and retired for the third and final time in the season. Belgium was next and Hamilton secured his 4th pole position in a row. Sebastian Vettel however was too quick for the Mercedes and he ran away with the race; Hamilton and Rosberg finished 3rd and 4th and kept themselves in 2nd place in the championship.

India and Abu Dhabi came as the 2 venues for the team's final podium finishes after difficult races in Singapore, Korea and Japan-where Hamilton suffered his first retirement of the season. Nico Rosberg inherited 2nd place in India when Webber retired and he finished 'best of the rest' in 3rd behind the 2 Red Bulls in Abu Dhabi.

In Brazil Hamilton had been running 4th and on course for the podium but when lapping Valtteri Bottas they touched which left Hamilton with a puncture and a drive through which dropped him out of the points. He fought back to 9th and combined with Rosberg's 5th-place finish the team secured 2nd place in the Constructors' Championship, a huge improvement from 5th in 2012.

Complete Formula One results
(key) (results in bold indicate pole position; results in italics indicate fastest lap)

 Driver failed to finish the race, but was classified as they had completed greater than 90% of the race distance..

References

External links

 The official website of Mercedes AMG Petronas F1 Team
 

F1 W04